Against Henry, King of the English, originally in Latin as Contra Henricum Regem Anglie, was a book written in 1522 by Martin Luther against Henry VIII of England. It was a response to Henry's book, Assertio septem sacramentorum. Thomas More then wrote Responsio ad Lutherum as a reply.

References

External links
Against Henry, King of the English
English translation by Rev. E. S. Buchanan (1928)

1522 books
16th-century Christian texts
Henry VIII
Martin Luther